Alfie Ferguson, CBE (c. 1927 - 4 December 1992) was a British and unionist politician in Northern Ireland. He was a member of the Ulster Unionist Party and served as Lord Mayor of Belfast (1983–85).

Alfred Henry Ferguson was an industrial engineer by profession, but from a young age he had an ambition of becoming a councillor. He realised this ambition when he was first elected to Belfast City Hall in 1969. In 1982 he was elected as the 81st High Sheriff of Belfast, and in the following year he was elected Mayor of Belfast. In 1985 he was honoured with a CBE and in 1987 he was made deputy Lord Lieutenant. He was married to Elizabeth, with whom he has three sons. The family were members of the Church of Ireland. Alfie Ferguson died 4 December 1992 at his Crumlin Road home, he was 65.

References

1992 deaths
Commanders of the Order of the British Empire
High Sheriffs of Belfast
Irish Anglicans
Lord Mayors of Belfast
Ulster Unionist Party councillors
Year of birth missing